You Can Call It a Day is a 1949 thriller novel by the British writer Peter Cheyney who had gained a reputation for writing popular novels in the American hardboiled style. It was the first of a trilogy featuring the private detective  Johnny Vallon, a hard-drinking former army officer. It was also published under the alternative title of The Man Nobody Saw.

References

Bibliography
 James, Russell. Great British Fictional Detectives. Remember When, 21 Apr 2009.
 Reilly, John M. Twentieth Century Crime & Mystery Writers. Springer, 2015.

1949 British novels
Novels by Peter Cheyney
British thriller novels
Novels set in London
William Collins, Sons books